The Buenos Aires Esperanto Association (BEA;) is an independent non-profit organization first established in 1916, which aims to spread and support Esperanto in Buenos Aires, Argentina.

The organization is a pioneer in the Esperanto movement in Argentina. It was founded on December 20, 1916 as the Argentine Esperanto Association. Created as a nationwide association, its name was changed to the Buenos Aires Esperanto Association on April 12, 1941, when the Argentine Esperanto League was born, and its scope was reduced to Greater Buenos Aires.

References

External links 
 Official site 

Organizations established in 1916
Esperanto organizations
Education in Buenos Aires
Culture in Buenos Aires